Marta Weigle (July 3, 1944 – June 14, 2018) was an American anthropologist and folklorist.

Weigle earned her doctorate from the University of Pennsylvania in 1971, and began teaching English and anthropology at the University of New Mexico the next year. From 1982, Weigle also taught American studies. In 1990, she was appointed a University Regents Professor in the anthropology department. Weigle chaired the department from 1995 to 2002.

References

1944 births
2018 deaths
American anthropologists
American folklorists
American women anthropologists
University of Pennsylvania alumni
University of New Mexico faculty
Women folklorists
American women academics
21st-century American women